Massimo Scaligero, born Antonio Sgabelloni in Veroli, Italy (1906–1980) an Italian spiritual teacher and member of "Gruppo di Ur". A mentee of Julius Evola, Scaligero espoused fierce antisemitic views which were combined with esotericism and anthroposophy into a system of "integral racism" with the aim to bring Germany and Italy closer together in the same way it would the spiritual and the biological.

Works

English
The Light (La Luce): An introduction to creative imagination. Great Barrington, MA: Lindesfarne Books, 2001. .
The Secrets of Space and Time. Great Barrington, MA: Lindesfarne Books, 2013. .
A Practical Manual of Meditation. Great Barrington, MA: Lindesfarne Books, 2015. .
A Treatise on Living Thinking: A Path beyond Western Philosophy, beyond Yoga, beyond Zen. Great Barrington, MA: Lindesfarne Books, 2015. .
The Logic Against Humanity: The Myth of Science and the Path of Thinking. Great Barrington, MA: Lindesfarne Books, 2017. .

Italian (untranslated)
"La Razza di Roma", Mantero, Tivoli, 1939
The Way of the Solar Will
Immortal Love
Yoga, Meditation, Magic
From Yoga to the Rose Cross
The Logos and the New Mysteries
Psychotherapy; 
Techniques of Inner Concentration
Healing with Thinking
Meditation and Miracles
Thinking as Antimaterialism
Western Kundalini
Isis Sophia
Zen and Logos

See also
Anthroposophy
The Philosophy of Freedom

References

External links
Massimo Scaligero, A Treatise on Living Thought, excerpt translated by Mark Nazzari Willan. Accessed 2009-04-07.

1906 births
1980 deaths
People from Veroli
Anthroposophists
Esotericists